Mojtaba Shiri Shourijeh (born 29 October 1979 in Shiraz, Iran) was an Iranian football defender. After a great season with Esteghlal Ahvaz he was soon noticed by Iran national football team coach Ali Daei and was included in the national team for the WAFF championships. His elder brother, Mehdi was also a professional football player.

Club career
He started to shine in 2003–04 season with Persepolis where he was used as the defensive midfielder and moved to Esteghlal Ahvaz where he stayed for 4 seasons and had an excellent season in 2007–08 seasons where in league he played more minutes than any other player. He moved to Persepolis in summer 2008 and was used as center back, left back and defensive midfielder.

Club career statistics
Last Update:  11 May 2013 

 Assist Goals

International career
He played in WAFF 2007 and was invited again under Ali Daei for the first round of world cup qualifications in 2008 where he came on the pitch as a substitute against Kuwait. He was invited again for WAFF 2008.

Honours

Club
Iran's Premier Football League
Runner up: 1
2006–07 with Esteghlal Ahvaz
Hazfi Cup
Winner: 2
2009–10 with Persepolis
2010–11 with Persepolis

References

External links 
 Mojtaba Shiri at PersianLeague.com
 Mojtaba Shiri's Profile in 18ghadam.ir

Living people
Iranian footballers
Persian Gulf Pro League players
Bargh Shiraz players
Esteghlal Ahvaz players
Persepolis F.C. players
1979 births
Association football defenders
Iran international footballers
People from Shiraz
Sportspeople from Fars province